Lake Cavanaugh is a census-designated place (CDP) in Skagit County, Washington, United States. The population was 167 at the 2010 census. It is included in the Mount Vernon–Anacortes, Washington Metropolitan Statistical Area.

Based on per capita income, Lake Cavanaugh ranks 30th of 522 areas in the state of Washington to be ranked. It is also the highest rank achieved in Skagit County.

Geography
Lake Cavanaugh is located at  (48.325855, -122.020391).

According to the United States Census Bureau, the CDP has a total area of 2.1 square miles (5.5 km2), of which, 0.9 square miles (2.3 km2) of it is land and 1.3 square miles (3.3 km2) of it (59.15%) is water.

Demographics
As of the census of 2000, there were 122 people, 58 households, and 41 families residing in the CDP. The population density was 140.3 people per square mile (54.1/km2). There were 386 housing units at an average density of 443.8/sq mi (171.3/km2). The racial makeup of the CDP was 98.36% White, 0.82% Asian, and 0.82% from two or more races.

There were 58 households, out of which 10.3% had children under the age of 18 living with them, 70.7% were married couples living together, and 27.6% were non-families. 25.9% of all households were made up of individuals, and 3.4% had someone living alone who was 65 years of age or older. The average household size was 2.10 and the average family size was 2.43.

In the CDP, the age distribution of the population shows 9.8% under the age of 18, 5.7% from 18 to 24, 11.5% from 25 to 44, 55.7% from 45 to 64, and 17.2% who were 65 years of age or older. The median age was 54 years. For every 100 females, there were 117.9 males. For every 100 females age 18 and over, there were 129.2 males.

The median income for a household in the CDP was $66,250, and the median income for a family was $95,012. Males had a median income of $35,096 versus $0 for females. The per capita income for the CDP was $32,195. None of the population or families were below the poverty line.

References

External links
 Lake Cavanaugh Community Web Page

Census-designated places in Skagit County, Washington
Census-designated places in Washington (state)